Kuh-e Bandaka (Pashto: کوه بندکا) or Kohe Bandaka, Koh-i Bandaka, Bandako, or incorrectly Koh-i-Bandakor) is one of the highest peaks of the Hindu Kush mountain range in northeastern Afghanistan. It is northeast of Kabul and west of Chitral. Separated by a relatively low pass from the core of the Hindu Kush, it is the second highest mountain entirely within Afghanistan, and the most topographically prominent peak in all of Afghanistan.

On September 22, 1960, the second German expedition to visit the Hindu Kush made the
first ascent of Kuh-e Bandaka. The members of the expedition were Wolfgang von Hansemann, Dietrich Hasse, Siegbert Heine, and Johannes Winkler, all from West Berlin; all attained the summit. The expedition also made multiple first ascents in the Pagar Valley of the Hindu Kush, and made meteorological and geological observations and sketch maps.

There have been over fifteen subsequent ascents, via a variety of routes; however there have been no recorded ascents since 1977.

Climate

References

Landforms of Badakhshan Province
Mountains of Afghanistan
Mountains of the Hindu Kush
Six-thousanders of the Hindu Kush